The second season of Indonesian Idol premiered on 25 March 2005 and continued until 13 August 2005. It was co-hosted by Amelia Natasha and Irgy Ahmad Fahrezi. Indra Lesmana, Titi DJ and Meuthia Kasim judged from audition round till spectacular show, while Yovie Widianto replaced Dimas Djayadiningrat in audition round till workshop round before being replaced again with Dimas Djayadiningrat. Mike Mohede won the season with Judika as the runner-up, Firman Siagian finishing third and Monita Tahalea finishing fourth. This was the first season to have a finale with two male contestants, with the third season being the second.

Auditions 
All of the Auditions were held In five cities: Surabaya, Bandung, Makassar, Yogyakarta and Jakarta.

Workshop

Group 1

Group 2

Group 3

Spectacular Show

Spectacular Show 1 – Indonesian Top Hits

Spectacular Show 2 – Band Hits

Spectacular Show 3 – 90's

Spectacular Show 4 – Upbeat Songs

Spectacular Show 5 – Rock

Spectacular Show 6 – My Idols

Spectacular Show 7 – Legends

Elimination chart

Statistics

References

External links 
 Official Website 

Indonesian Idol
2005 Indonesian television seasons